Ramya Ramana (born March 3, 1995) is an American poet based in New York City. Ramana is a winner of the Youth Poet Laureate of New York City award. In 2015, Ramana was invited to participate in a local event in Guyana hosted by One Billion Rising a domestic violence awareness organization.

Career
In 2014, Ramana won the New York Knicks Poetry Slam with a scholarship to St. John’s University. In January 2014, Ramya was invited to read a poem titled New York City at the inauguration ceremony for Mayor Bill de Blasio. Ramana also appeared in a TV show Verses & Flow which was aired in 2014.

As a Youth Poet Laureate, Ramana has been working with the New York City Campaign Finance Board’s voter education campaign. In March 2014, she performed at the Joe's Pub at The Public.

Notable poetries
 Miss America poem 
 New York City
 It Is Not Your Problem
 We Will No Longer Stay Silent to this Classism
 Don't Drown Her in the Baptism

References

External links

1998 births
Living people
21st-century American poets